The Department of Administrative Services was an Australian government department that existed between July 1987 and March 1993. It was the third so-named Commonwealth department.

History
The department was created in July 1987 after the abolishment of several departments and was known as a 'super ministry.'

Scope
Information about the department's functions and/or government funding allocation could be found in the Administrative Arrangements Orders, the annual Portfolio Budget Statements and in the department's annual reports.

According to the Administrative Arrangements Order (AAO) made on 24 July 1987, the department dealt with:
Acquisition, leasing, management and disposal of land and property in Australia and overseas 
Transport and storage services 
Co-ordination of purchasing policy and civil Purchasing 
Disposal of goods 
Provision of accommodation and catering 
Protective services at Commonwealth establishments 
Analytical laboratory services 
Meteorology Ionospheric prediction 
National Archives 
Valuation services 
Geodesy, mapping and surveying services 
Planning, execution and maintenance of Commonwealth Government works 
Design and maintenance of Government furniture, furnishings and fittings 
Information co-ordination and services within Australia, including printing, publishing and advertising 
Electoral matters 
Australian honours and symbols policy 
Provision of facilities for members of Parliament other than in Parliament House 
Administrative support for Royal Commissions and certain Committees of Inquiry.

Structure
The department was an Australian Public Service department, staffed by officials who were responsible to the Minister for Administrative Services.

The secretary of the department was initially Graham Glenn, with Noel Tanzer succeeding him on 1 March 1989. Tanzer's mandate was to have the department work as a unit and begin to operate in accordance with commercial principles.

References

Ministries established in 1987
Administrative Services
1987 establishments in Australia
1993 disestablishments in Australia